Yasmine Hamza (born 16 September 2003) is an Italian badminton player affiliated with SSVBozen. She won the National Championships title in 2019 and 2021. Hamza clinched her first senior international title at the 2019 South Africa International in the women's doubles event partnered with Katharina Fink. Together with Fink, they won the silver medal at the 2022 Mediterranean Games.

Achievements

Mediterranean Games 
Women's doubles

BWF International Challenge/Series (3 titles, 7 runners-up) 
Women's singles

Women's doubles

  BWF International Challenge tournament
  BWF International Series tournament
  BWF Future Series tournament

BWF Junior International (7 titles, 2 runners-up
Girls' singles

Girls' doubles

  BWF Junior International Grand Prix tournament
  BWF Junior International Challenge tournament
  BWF Junior International Series tournament
  BWF Junior Future Series tournament

References

External links 
 

2002 births
Living people
Sportspeople from Bolzano
Italian female badminton players
Competitors at the 2018 Mediterranean Games
Competitors at the 2022 Mediterranean Games
Mediterranean Games silver medalists for Italy
Mediterranean Games medalists in badminton
21st-century Italian women